Billerica-Wilmington Airport was an airfield operational in the mid-20th century in Billerica, Massachusetts and Wilmington, Massachusetts.

References

Defunct airports in Massachusetts
Airports in Middlesex County, Massachusetts
Buildings and structures in Billerica, Massachusetts
Buildings and structures in Wilmington, Massachusetts